KZJB (90.3 FM) is a radio station broadcasting a Christian contemporary format. Licensed to Pocatello, Idaho, United States, the station serves the Pocatello area. The station is owned by Watersprings Ministries.

History
The station went on the air as KAWS on 1998-04-10. On 2005-06-29 the station became the current KZJB.

References

External links

ZJB
Contemporary Christian radio stations in the United States
Radio stations established in 1998
1998 establishments in Idaho